Osmunda japonica (syn. Osmunda nipponica Makino), also called Asian royal fern, is a fern in the genus Osmunda native to east Asia, including Japan, China, Korea, Taiwan, and the far east of Russia on the island of Sakhalin. It is called gobi in Korean, zenmai in Japanese, and zǐqí or juécài ( or ) in Chinese.

It is a deciduous herbaceous plant which produces separate fertile and sterile fronds. The sterile fronds are spreading, up to 80–100 cm tall, bipinnate, with pinnae 20–30 cm long and pinnules 4–6 cm long and 1.5–2 cm broad; the fertile fronds are erect and shorter, 20–50 cm tall.

It grows in moist woodlands and can tolerate open sunlight only if in very wet soil. Like other ferns, it has no flowers, but rather elaborate sporangia, that very superficially might suggest a flower, from which the alternative name derives.

Like its relative Osmundastrum cinnamomeum ("cinnamon fern"), the fertile fronds become brown-colored and contain spores. The sterile (vegetative) fronds resemble those of Osmunda regalis ("royal fern"), another relative of O. japonica.

In some parts of China, Tibet, and Japan, the young fronds or fiddleheads of O. japonica are used as a vegetable. In Korea too, these young shoots are commonly used to make dishes like namul.

O. japonica has also been shown to be a significant reducer of air toxins, specifically formaldehydes.

References

External links 
 
 Flora of Taiwan: Osmunda japonica
 Eating from the wild: diversity of wild edible plants used by Tibetans in Shangri-la region, Yunnan, China

Osmundales
Ferns of Asia
Flora of China
Flora of Eastern Asia
Flora of Sakhalin
Flora of Japan
Flora of Korea
Flora of Tibet
Flora of Russia
Flora of Taiwan
Ferns of China
Ferns of Japan
Ferns of Korea
Ferns of Tibet
Ferns of Russia
Ferns of Taiwan